MellowHypeWeek (stylized as MELLOWHYPEWEEK) is the third mixtape by Odd Future sub-group MellowHype. It was released to hold fan over until they released their second and final studio album, Numbers. A track was released everyday starting September 11 up to September 18, 2012. It contains features from Juicy J and Domo Genesis.

Track listing
 All songs produced by Left Brain, except for "Godsss" produced by Hodgy Beats.

References 

2010 albums
Albums produced by Left Brain
Hip hop albums by American artists
Odd Future